Ri Jin-Hyok (born 28 August 1989) is a North Korean footballer who plays as a midfielder. He plays club football for Rimyŏngsu of the DPR Korea Premier Football League.

References 

Living people
1989 births
North Korean footballers
North Korea international footballers
Association football midfielders